State Highway 16 (SH 16) is a New Zealand state highway linking central Auckland with Wellsford, via Auckland's Northwestern Motorway, Helensville and Kaukapakapa.

Within the Auckland metropolitan area, SH 16 mostly runs along the Northwestern Motorway, the major exception being the first 2 km between the Port of Auckland and the Central Motorway Junction. Outside the Auckland metropolitan area, SH 16 is a single carriageway with at-grade intersections.

Route
SH 16 begins in Central Auckland at the corner of The Strand, Tamaki Drive and Quay Street, directly opposite the Port of Auckland. It travels south via The Strand where it reaches the lights at Beach Road and Parnell Rise where it changes to Stanley Street. After one more set of lights at Alten Road, SH 16 becomes coextensive with the Auckland Northwestern Motorway. The highway travels through the Central Motorway Junction where there are exits to  both northbound and southbound. The Northwestern Motorway terminates at a roundabout with Brigham Creek Road and Fred Taylor Drive. From here SH 16 reverts to single carriage road. It passes through the communities of Kumeu, Huapai, Waimauku and Helensville, eventually reaching the west coast. From there on SH 16 skirts the Kaipara Harbour along the Kaipara Coast Highway, eventually bearing northeast to meet SH 1 at Wellsford, where it terminates.

Route changes
SH 16 north of Helensville to Wellsford was temporarily revoked in 1994. It was reinstated in 1997.

Major intersections

Refer to Northwestern Motorway for a complete list of motorway intersections

See also
List of New Zealand state highways

References

16
Transport in the Auckland Region